The 2018–19 season was Cardiff City's 120th season in their existence and their second in the Premier League. Cardiff were promoted to the top tier of English football league system for the first time since 2013 during the 2017–18 season. Along with competing in the Premier League, the club also participated in the FA Cup and EFL Cup. The season covered the period from 1 July 2018 to 30 June 2019.

On 21 January, a Piper PA-46 Malibu light aircraft transporting Cardiff's recently signed player Emiliano Sala was crashed off Alderney, in the Channel Islands. The aircraft had been travelling from Nantes, France, to Cardiff. The wreckage of the aircraft was found thirteen days later. He was confirmed dead on 7 February. Two days before the tragedy, Sala was presented as a Cardiff player but had not decided on his shirt number at that time. Cardiff and Nantes are in dispute over the payment of the transfer fee for Sala.

Kit

|
|
|
|
|
|
|

First-team squad

 Appearances and goals for the club and contracts are up to date as of 13 May 2019.

Statistics

|-
!colspan=14|Player(s) out on loan:

|}

Goals record

Disciplinary record

Suspensions

Contracts

Transfers

In

 Spent:  – Undisclosed (~ £32,000,000)

Out

Loan in

Loan out

Competitions

Friendlies

Premier League

League table

Result summary

Results by matchday

Matches
On 14 June 2018, the Premier League fixtures for the forthcoming season were announced.

FA Cup

The third round draw was made live on BBC by Ruud Gullit and Paul Ince from Stamford Bridge on 3 December 2018.

EFL Cup

The second round draw was made from the Stadium of Light on 16 August.

Summary

Club staff

Backroom staff

Board of directors

References

Cardiff City F.C. seasons
Cardiff City
Cardiff